King Pleasure (born Clarence Beeks; March 24, 1922 – March 21, 1982) was an American jazz vocalist and an early master of vocalese, where a singer sings words to a well-known instrumental solo.

Biography
Born as Clarence Beeks in Oakdale, Tennessee, he moved to New York City in the mid-1940s working as a bartender and became a fan of bebop music. King Pleasure first gained attention by singing the Eddie Jefferson vocalese classic "Moody's Mood For Love", based on a 1949 James Moody saxophone solo to "I'm In The Mood For Love". Pleasure's 1952 recording, his first after signing a contract with the Prestige label, is considered a jazz classic; the female vocalist featured is Blossom Dearie. He and Betty Carter also recorded a famous vocalese version of "Red Top", a jazz classic penned by Kansas Citian Ben Kynard and recorded by Gene Ammons and others. Other notable recordings include a presciently elegiac version of "Parker's Mood", the year before Charlie Parker died in 1955, and Pleasure's take on Ammons's "Hittin' The Jug", retitled as "Swan Blues" in 1962.

Pleasure has been cited as a significant influence by Van Morrison, especially on his album Astral Weeks. Genya Ravan, drawing big inspiration for her singing from King Pleasure, recorded "Moody's Mood For Love" with James Moody on her 1972 CBS album Genya Ravan.

Pleasure died on March 21, 1982, three days before his 60th birthday.

Discography

10-inch shellac (78rpm) and 7-inch vinyl (45rpm) releases
1952: "Moody Mood For Love" // "Exclamation Blues" (Prestige 924) – Merrill Stepter (trumpet); Lem Davis (alto sax); Ray Abrams (tenor sax); Cecil Payne (baritone sax); Teacho Wiltshire (piano); Leonard Gaskin (bass); Teddy Lee (drums); King Pleasure (vocals); Blossom Dearie (vocals) – NYC, February 19
1952:  "Red Top" // "Jumpin' With Symphony Sid" (Prestige 821) – Ed Lewis (trumpet); Charlie Ferguson (tenor sax); Ed Swanston (piano); Peck Morrison (bass); Herbie Lovelle (drums); King Pleasure (vocals); Betty Carter (vocals) – NYC, December 12
1953: "Sometimes I'm Happy" // "This Is Always" (Prestige 860) – John Lewis (piano); Percy Heath (bass); Kenny Clarke (drums); King Pleasure (vocals); Dave Lambert Singers (vocal trio) – NYC, September 29
1953: "Parker's Mood" // "What Can I Say Dear (After I Say I'm Sorry)" (Prestige 880) – John Lewis (piano); Percy Heath (bass); Kenny Clarke (drums); King Pleasure (vocals) – NYC, December 24
1954: "I'm Gone" // "You're Crying" (Prestige 908) – J.J. Johnson, Kai Winding (trombone); Lucky Thompson (tenor sax); Danny Bank (baritone sax); Jimmy Jones (piano); Paul Chambers (bass); Joe Harris (drums); King Pleasure (vocals); Jon Hendricks, Eddie Jefferson, The Three Riffs (chorus); Quincy Jones (arranger, director) – Van Gelder Studio, Hackensack, NJ, December 7
1954: "Don't Get Scared" // "Funk Junction" (Prestige 913) – J.J. Johnson, Kai Winding (trombone); Lucky Thompson (tenor sax); Danny Bank (baritone sax); Jimmy Jones (piano); Paul Chambers (bass); Joe Harris (drums); King Pleasure (vocals); Jon Hendricks, Eddie Jefferson, The Three Riffs (chorus); Quincy Jones (arranger, director) – Van Gelder Studio, Hackensack, NJ, December 7
1955: "Diaper Pin" // "Evening Blues" (Jubilee 5226) – (unknown personnel)
1956: "D.B. Blues" // "Blues I Like To Hear" (Aladdin 3343) – (unknown personnel)
1956: "At Your Beck And Call" // "I'm In The Mood For Love" (Aladdin 3352) – (unknown personnel)
1958: "Red Top" // "Don't Get Scared" (Prestige 45-124) — reissues of Prestige 821A and 913A.
1960: "Jumpin' With Symphony Sid" // "Parker's Mood" (Prestige 45-182) — reissues of Prestige 821B and 880A.
1960: "Golden Days" // "All Of Me" (HiFi Jazz 5004; from Golden Days album)
1962: "Mean To Me" // "This Is Always" (United Artists 527; from Mr. Jazz album)
1963: "Don't Get Scared" // "I'm In The Mood For Love" (United Artists 636; from Mr. Jazz album)
1968: "I'm In The Mood For Love" // "Red Top" (Prestige 45-744) — reissues of Prestige 924A and 821A.
1972: "That Old Black Magic" // "I'm In The Mood For Love" (United Artists 50940; from Moody's Mood For Love album)

7-inch EP
1957: King Pleasure Sings, Prestige #PREP-1338, (four tracks recorded 1952-53 include the singles: Prestige 821A&B, 860A&B).

10-inch LP
1955: King Pleasure Sings, Prestige #LP-208, (eight tracks recorded 1952-54 include the singles: Prestige 821A&B, 860A&B, 880A&B, 908A, and 913A).

12-inch LPs
1957: King Pleasure Sings/Annie Ross Sings, Prestige #PRLP-7128 — reissue: 1986, Original Jazz Classics #OJC-217 (with four Annie Ross tracks added; these are from Annie Ross Sings, Prestige #PREP-1301). NOTE: the CD reissue has all twelve King Pleasure recordings plus the four Annie Ross tracks.
1960: Golden Days, HiFi Jazz #J-425 — reissue: 1991, Original Jazz Classics #OJC-1772) – King Pleasure (vocals); Matthew Gee (trombone); Teddy Edwards, Harold Land (tenor sax); Gerald Wiggins (piano); Wilfred Middlebrooks (bass); Earl Palmer (drums).
1962: Mr. Jazz, United Artists #UAJ-14012/UAS-15012; 1968, Solid State #SS-18021 – (unknown personnel).
1968: Original Moody's Mood, Prestige #PR-7586. (this is a collection/compilation with all twelve recordings made for the Prestige label).
1972: The Source, Prestige #PR-24017. (2-LP set/reissue of Golden Days and Original Moody's Mood albums).
1972: Moody's Mood For Love, United Artists #UAS-5634; — CD reissue: 1992, Blue Note #84463. (reissue of Mr. Jazz album). NOTE: the CD also includes the two Jubilee and the four Aladdin tracks, plus three previously unreleased recordings as a bonus.

References

External links
[ Allmusic]
Image of Van Morrison holding a King Pleasure album

1922 births
1982 deaths
Singers from Tennessee
Vocalese singers
American jazz singers
Singers from New York City
People from Morgan County, Tennessee
Prestige Records artists
Bebop singers
Scat singers
20th-century American singers
Jazz musicians from Tennessee
Jazz musicians from New York (state)
20th-century American male singers
American male jazz musicians